Bekasang is a fermented fish condiment from Eastern Indonesia. It is usually found in area around Sulawesi and Moluccas archipelago. The main component of this food is the stomach of fish that is fermented just like shrimp paste

One manner of preparation uses salt and is fermented for about a month. Another way from Ternate, uses only the stomachs of tuna. There, it is customary to eat with Sago, garnished with lemon and bird's eye chili.

See also 
Dayok, a similar Filipino preparation
Shiokara, a similar Japanese preparation

References

Indonesian cuisine
Fermented foods

Fermented fish